Julie Nelson may refer to:

Julie Nelson (economist), American economist
Julie Nelson (TV anchor), American news anchor
Julie Nelson (footballer), Northern Irish footballer